Deadly is a 1991 Australian film directed by Esben Storm.

Production
Storm first wrote the script in 1987. He wanted to tell the story of Aboriginal deaths in custody and chose a thriller format to make the movie as accessible as possible.

The movie was shot on location in Wilcannia over seven weeks. It was the first of five features funded by the Film Finance Corporation's Film Trust Fund.

Plot
From the UK VHS slick for the movie:
Streetwise cop Tony Bourke is sent to a small town to complete a routine report on the death of Jimmie Bryant found hanging whilst in police custody.
His orders are clear - keep the affair away from the media and close the case within 24 hours.
The local police claim that Bryant committed suicide but the investigation exposes a number of inconsistencies in their story.
In the face of growing suspicion and hostility Bourke befriends the victim’s brother - his cellmate on the night of the killing. Together they are determined to see justice prevail … at any cost.

Release
Ozmovies says of the film:
The film was given a brief outing in a few Hoyts cinemas, beginning in Sydney on 13th August 1992 and the same day in Hoyts Melbourne...

The film received mixed to negative reviews in its limited domestic theatrical release.

References

Deadly at Ozmovies

External links

1991 films
Australian crime drama films
Films scored by Graeme Revell
Films shot in Australia
1990s English-language films
1990s Australian films
Films about Aboriginal Australians